North Zhongzhou Road (Hanyu Pinyin: Bei Zhongzhou Lu) is a road lying on the central axis of Beijing. It originally ran from North Zhonglou Bridge on the Northern 2nd Ring Road through to the Northern 4th Ring Road, before being extended northwards to the Olympic Forest Park. The total length of the road is approximately 6.8 kilometres.

Traffic on the road is remarkably smooth.

Streets in Beijing